Chaubepur Assembly constituency is one of the 403 Vidhan Sabha (legislative assembly) constituencies of the Uttar Pradesh Legislative Assembly, India.

Members of Legislative Assembly

Election results

References
http://www.elections.in/uttar-pradesh/assembly-constituencies/2002-election-results.html

External links
 

Assembly constituencies of Uttar Pradesh
Politics of Kanpur